The Rheinkniebrücke (English: Rhine knee bridge) is a cable-stayed bridge leading over the Rhine at the Rheinknie in Düsseldorf with a six-lane motor road and two combined pedestrian and cycle paths, which was opened to traffic on 16 October 1969.

History 
The decision to build the bridge was made in 1962. The architect Friedrich Tamms was entrusted with the development of the project. Fritz Leonhardt was appointed chief engineer. The bridge was built in 1965 by Deutsche Maschinenbau-Aktiengesellschaft (Demag AG), Gutehoffnungshütte, Aktienverein für Bergbau und Hüttenbetrieb and Hein, Lehmann & Co.. The bridge was commissioned on October 16, 1969. At the time of its opening, it was a cable-stayed bridge with the longest span in the world.

Location 
The bridge connects the Düsseldorf districts of Unterbilk and Oberkassel. The bridge got its name from its location.

References

See also 
 List of bridges in Germany

Buildings and structures in Düsseldorf
Streets in Düsseldorf
Bridges in Germany
Pedestrian bridges in Germany
Road bridges in Germany
Bridges over the Rhine
1969 establishments in Germany
Bridges completed in 1969